Errol Dixon (1937–31 January 2023) was a singer and blues pianist. He was born in 1937 in Jamaica, and as a boy moved to New York. He later moved to the United Kingdom, where he started his music career. Since 2000, he lived in the canton Schwyz, Switzerland.

In 1965 he was with the Ram Jam Band before Geno Washington joined. He recorded with them; the single "Shake Shake Senora" was released, but made no commercial impact.

During his career he has released more than 15 albums and 30 singles.

Errol Dixon passed away after a brief illness while visiting Jamaica in 2023.

References

External links
 Errol Dixon singles on 45cat
 Errol Dixon website

1937 births
Living people
Musicians from New York City
British blues pianists
Emigrants from British Jamaica to the United States
American emigrants to the United Kingdom
21st-century British pianists